Tomás mac Gilbert Ó Cellaigh, Bishop of Clonfert, died 1378.

Tomás was a son of a king of Ui Maine, Gilbert Ó Cellaigh, who reigned 1307–15, and again from 1318 till his death in 1322.

Tomás became bishop before 14 October 1347, the see having been vacant for some years after the death of Bishop Seoán Ó Leaáin in 1336. Ó Cellaigh died 1378, being succeeded by his cousin, Muircheartach mac Pilib Ó Ceallaigh.

References

External links
 http://www.ucc.ie/celt/published/T100005C/
 https://archive.org/stream/fastiecclesiaehi04cottuoft#page/n17/mode/2up
 http://www.irishtimes.com/ancestor/surname/index.cfm?fuseaction=Go.&UserID=

Archbishops of Tuam
14th-century Roman Catholic bishops in Ireland
People from County Galway
Bishops of Clonfert